Lesbian, gay, bisexual, and transgender (LGBT) rights in Sint Eustatius are quite progressive by Caribbean standards. Sint Eustatius forms part of the Caribbean Netherlands and is a special municipalitiy of the Netherlands. Both male and female same-sex sexual activity are legal in Sint Eustatius, with same-sex marriage, registered partnership, and adoption being legal since 2012. In addition, discrimination on the basis of "heterosexual and homosexual orientation" is outlawed.

Law regarding same-sex sexual activity
Same-sex sexual activity is legal in Sint Eustatius.

Recognition of same-sex relationships

Same-sex marriage in Sint Eustatius became legal following the entry into force of a law enabling same-sex couples to marry there on 10 October 2012.

The issue of same-sex marriage caused considerable controversy in Sint Eustatius. In 2010, the Island Council expressed unanimous opposition to the extension of same-sex marriage to Sint Eustatius. The same-sex marriage law being passed by the Dutch House of Representatives led to calls of "neo-colonialism".

Discrimination protections
The Criminal Code BES, which applies to Sint Eustatius and the islands of Bonaire and Saba, criminalizes discrimination on the basis of "heterosexual and homosexual orientation". Article 144 provides for penalties varying from fines to two years' imprisonment.

In addition, Article 1 of the Constitution of the Netherlands applies to Sint Eustatius. The article reads "All persons in the Netherlands shall be treated equally in equal
circumstances. Discrimination on the grounds of religion, belief, political opinion, race or sex or on any other grounds whatsoever shall not be permitted."

The Netherlands Institute for Human Rights (College voor de Rechten van de Mens) is a research institute which "protects, advances and monitors human rights". The Institute, established by law in 2010, works in the European Netherlands and also in the Caribbean Netherlands.

Living conditions
Due to Sint Eustatius' very small population, there is no gay scene on the island, nor any specific gay bars or venues. A majority of St. Eustatians affiliate with Christian churches, with Methodism and Roman Catholicism being the two largest denominations. As such, societal perceptions of LGBT people tend to reflect Christian mores, and gay and lesbian locals "tend to keep a low profile".

Summary table

See also

LGBT rights in the Netherlands
LGBT rights in the Americas
LGBT rights in Bonaire
LGBT rights in Saba
Same-sex marriage in Bonaire, Sint Eustatius and Saba

References